The Saints Constantine and Helen Church  was an Orthodox church in Mariupol, Ukraine.

History 
It was an Orthodox church in honor of the Roman emperor Constantine the Great and his mother Helena. The architect Victor Nilsen designed and built this church between 1903 and 1911
The building stood until it was demolished in 1934 during the Soviet era by the Bolshevik government as part of the Atheist Five-Year Plan.

Gallery

References

External links
 Old Mariupol
 Misto Mariupol
 mrpl.city

1930s disestablishments in Ukraine
Buildings and structures in Mariupol
History of Mariupol
Religion in Mariupol
Demolished churches in Ukraine
Buildings and structures demolished in 1934
Mariupol